Ali Al-Rasheed (Arabic:علي الرشيد) (born 16 April 1993) is an Emirati footballer who plays as a midfielder .

External links

References

Emirati footballers
1993 births
Living people
Ras Al Khaimah Club players
Emirates Club players
Al Dhafra FC players
Hatta Club players
Place of birth missing (living people)
Association football midfielders
UAE Pro League players